The Woman Beneath is a 1917 American silent drama film directed by Travers Vale and starring Ethel Clayton, Crauford Kent and Isabel Berwin.

Cast
 Ethel Clayton as Betty Fairchild
 Curtis Cooksey as Tom Connolly
 Isabel Berwin as Mrs. Fairchild
 Frank de Vernon as Mr. Fairchild
 Crauford Kent as Rupert Brantley
 Eugenie Woodward as Mrs. Connolly

References

External links
 

1917 films
1917 drama films
1910s English-language films
American silent feature films
Silent American drama films
Films directed by Travers Vale
American black-and-white films
World Film Company films
1910s American films